Urosaurus auriculatus is a species of lizard. The common name for this species is the Socorro Island tree lizard. Its range includes Socorro Island in Baja California.

References 

Urosaurus
Reptiles of Mexico
Reptiles described in 1871
Taxa named by Edward Drinker Cope